Salamonie Township is one of twelve townships in Huntington County, Indiana, United States. As of the 2020 census, its population was 2,260.

History
Salamonie Township was organized in 1835. It was named from the Salamonie River.

Geography
The stream of Weasel Creek runs through this township.

Cities and towns
 Warren

Unincorporated towns
 Buckeye

Adjacent townships
 Rock Creek Township (north)
 Rockcreek Township, Wells County (northeast)
 Liberty Township, Wells County (east)
 Chester Township, Wells County (southeast)
 Jackson Township, Wells County (south)
 Van Buren Township, Grant County (southwest)
 Jefferson Township (west)
 Lancaster Township (northwest)

Cemeteries
The township contains eight cemeteries: Woodlawn, Masonic, Spring Hill, Mitchell, Red Men, Thompson Home, West Union, and Good-Jones.

Major highways
  Interstate 69
  State Road 3
  State Road 5
  State Road 124
  State Road 218

Education
Salamonie township contains one elementary school: Salamonie School. 

Salamonie Township residents may obtain a free library card from the Warren Public Library in Warren.

Demographics

References
 U.S. Board on Geographic Names (GNIS)
 United States Census Bureau cartographic boundary files

External links
 Indiana Township Association
 United Township Association of Indiana

Townships in Huntington County, Indiana
Townships in Indiana